Dwayne Allen White (born February 10, 1967) is a former professional American football player who played in seven National Football League (NFL) seasons from 1990 to 1996 for the New York Jets and the St. Louis Rams.  He was the primary run-blocker for the Jets' short-yardage "Road Grader" formation. He played college football at Alcorn State University. He served as Alcorn's athletic director from 2012 to 2014.

References

1967 births
Living people
Players of American football from Philadelphia
American football offensive guards
Alcorn State Braves football players
New York Jets players
St. Louis Rams players